This is the top 200 of the 2013 Times Higher Education-QS World University Rankings / Times Higher Education World University Rankings / QS World University Rankings of the top 300 universities in the world.

Top 200

References

University and college rankings